Kirstin Normand (born June 10, 1974) is a Canadian athlete. Normand was a competitor in synchronized swimming and Olympic medalist.

Born in North York, Ontario, Normand was the captain of the Canadian team that received a bronze medal in synchronized team at the 2000 Summer Olympics in Sydney, Australia.

References

External links
Olympic Info

1974 births
Living people
Canadian synchronized swimmers
Olympic bronze medalists for Canada
Olympic synchronized swimmers of Canada
Sportspeople from North York
Swimmers from Toronto
Synchronized swimmers at the 2000 Summer Olympics
Olympic medalists in synchronized swimming
Medalists at the 2000 Summer Olympics
Pan American Games medalists in synchronized swimming
Synchronized swimmers at the 1999 Pan American Games
Pan American Games gold medalists for Canada
Medalists at the 1999 Pan American Games
20th-century Canadian women
21st-century Canadian women